Toby Christian Haenen (born 8 October 1973) is an Australian backstroke swimmer of the 1990s, who won a bronze medal in the 4×100-metre medley relay at the 1996 Summer Olympics. He also competed at the 1992 Summer Olympics.

Haenen made his international debut at the 1992 Barcelona Games, where he finished 45th and 35th, respectively, in the 100-metre and 200-metre backstroke. At the 1996 Summer Olympics in Atlanta, Haenen swam the backstroke leg in the heats of the 4×100-metre medley relay, before being replaced by Steven Dewick in the team that trailed the United States and Russian teams in the final. Haenen did not compete in any individual events.

References

External links
Australian Olympic Committee profile

1973 births
Living people
Olympic bronze medalists for Australia
Olympic bronze medalists in swimming
Olympic swimmers of Australia
Sportspeople from Launceston, Tasmania
Swimmers at the 1992 Summer Olympics
Swimmers at the 1996 Summer Olympics
Medalists at the 1996 Summer Olympics
Australian male backstroke swimmers
20th-century Australian people